Rhinobothryum is a genus of snakes in the family Colubridae.

Geographic range
The genus Rhinobothryum is endemic to Central America and South America.

Species
Two species are recognized as being valid.
Rhinobothryum bovallii Andersson, 1916
Rhinobothryum lentiginosum (Scopoli, 1785)

References

Further reading
Boulenger GA (1896). Catalogue of the Snakes in the British Museum (Natural History). Volume III., Containing the Colubridæ (Opisthoglyphæ and Proteroglyphæ) ... London: Trustees of the British Museum (Natural History). (Taylor and Francis, printers). xiv + 727 pp. + Plates I-XXV. (Genus Rhinobothryum, p. 82).
Wagler J (1830). Natürliches System der AMPHIBIEN, mit vorangehender Classification der SÄUGTHIERE und VÖGEL. Ein Beitreg zur vergleichenden Zoologie. Munich, Stuttgart and Tübingen: J.G. Cotta. vi + 354 pp. + one plate. (Rhinobothryum, new genus, p. 186). (in German and Latin).

Rhinobothryum
Snake genera